Lisa See (born 18th February 1955) is an American writer and novelist. Her books include On Gold Mountain: The One-Hundred-Year Odyssey of My Chinese-American Family (1995), a detailed account of See's family history, and the novels Flower Net (1997), The Interior (1999), Dragon Bones (2003), Snow Flower and the Secret Fan (2005), Peony in Love (2007) and Shanghai Girls (2009), which made it to the 2010 New York Times bestseller list. Both Shanghai Girls and Snow Flower and the Secret Fan received honorable mentions from the Asian/Pacific American Awards for Literature.

See's novel, The Tea Girl of Hummingbird Lane (2017), is a story about circumstances, culture, and distance among the Akha people of Xishuangbanna, China. Her 2019 novel The Island of Sea Women is a story about female friendship and family secrets on Jeju Island before, during and in the aftermath of the Korean War.

Flower Net, The Interior, and Dragon Bones make up the Red Princess mystery series. Snow Flower and the Secret Fan and Peony in Love focus on the lives of Chinese women in the 19th and 17th centuries respectively. Shanghai Girls (2009) chronicles the lives of two sisters who come to Los Angeles in arranged marriages and face, among other things, the pressures put on Chinese-Americans during the anti-Communist mania of the 1950s. See completed a sequel titled Dreams of Joy, released in May 2011. China Dolls (June 2014) deals with Chinese American nightclub performers of the 1930s and 1940s.

Writing under the pen name Monica Highland, See, her mother Carolyn See, and John Espey, published two novels: Lotus Land (1983), 110 Shanghai Road (1986), and Greetings from Southern California (1988), a collection of early 20th Century postcards and commentary on the history they represent. She has a personal essay ("The Funeral Banquet") included in the anthology Half and Half.

See has donated her personal papers (1973–2001) to UCLA. During the 2012 Golden Dragon Chinese New Year Parade in Los Angeles Chinatown, See served as the Grand Marshal.

Early life 
On February 18, 1955, See was born in Paris, France. See's mother was Carolyn See, an American student who later became an English professor, writer, and novelist. See's father was Richard See, an American student who later became an anthropologist.

See's parents were later divorced, and her mother married Tom Sturak. See has a half-sister, Clara Sturak. See has spent many years in Los Angeles, California, especially in and around the Los Angeles Chinatown.

Her paternal great-grandfather Fong See (鄺泗) was Chinese, making her one-eighth Chinese. This has had a great impact on her life and work. She has written for and led in many cultural events emphasizing the importance of Los Angeles and Chinatown.

Education 
See graduated with a B.A. from Loyola Marymount University in 1979.

Career 
See was the West Coast correspondent for Publishers Weekly (1983–1996). See has written articles for Vogue, Self, and More; has written the libretto for the opera based on On Gold Mountain, and has helped develop the Family Discovery Gallery for the Autry Museum, which depicts 1930s Los Angeles from the perspective of her father as a seven-year-old boy. Her exhibition On Gold Mountain: A Chinese American Experience was featured in the Autry Museum of Western Heritage, and the Smithsonian. See is also a public speaker.

Filmography 
 2019 To Climb a Gold Mountain - as herself.

Awards 
Among her awards and recognitions are the Organization of Chinese Americans Women's 2001 award as National Woman of the Year and the 2003 History Makers Award presented by the Chinese American Museum. See serves as a Los Angeles City Commissioner.

Bibliography 
 On Gold Mountain: The One-Hundred-Year Odyssey of My Chinese American Family. St. Martins Press, 1995. 
 Flower Net. HarperCollins, 1997.
 The Interior. HarperCollins, 1999.
 Dragon Bones. Random House, Inc., 2003. 
 Snow Flower and the Secret Fan. Random House, Inc., 2005. 
 Peony in Love. Random House, Inc., 2007. 
 Shanghai Girls. Random House, Inc., 2009. 
 Chinatown (guidebook), Angels Walk LA, 2003.
 Dreams of Joy. Random House, Inc., 2011. 
 China Dolls. Random House, Inc., 2014.
 The Tea Girl of Hummingbird Lane. Scribner, 2017.
 The Island of Sea Women. Scribner, 2019. 

 References 

 Additional sources 
 Fenby, Jonathan. Modern China. New York: HarperCollins Publishers (2008).
 Gifford, Rob. China Road: A Journey into the Future of a Rising Power. New York: Random House Trade Paperbacks (2007).
 Liu, Xian. "Lisa Lenine See". In Asian American Novelists: A Bio-Biblical Critical Sourcebook, pp. 323–331. Ed. Nelson, Emmanuel S. Westport, CT: Greenwood Publishing Group Inc. (2000).
 Pan, Philip P. Out of Mao's Shadow. New York: Simon and Schuster (2008).
 See, Carolyn. Dreaming: Hard Luck and Good Times in America''. Los Angeles: University of California Press (1996).

External links 
 "On Gold Mountain: A Chinese American Experience", Autry Museum of Western Heritage.
 Lisa See interviewed on Conversations from Penn State, Youtube.com.

1955 births
Living people
American women novelists
American women essayists
American women historians
American novelists of Chinese descent
American women writers of Chinese descent
Chinatown, Los Angeles
Loyola Marymount University alumni
Writers from Los Angeles
Writers from California
20th-century American essayists
21st-century American essayists
20th-century American historians
21st-century American historians
20th-century American novelists
21st-century American novelists
20th-century American women writers
21st-century American women writers
Historians from California